The John M. Mossman Lock Collection is housed at the General Society of Mechanics and Tradesmen of the City of New York building, located at 20 West 44th Street in midtown Manhattan, which is listed on the National Register of Historic Places.  The museum houses one of the largest collections of bank and vault locks in the world, with more than 370 locks, keys and tools dating from 4000 BC to the modern 20th-century. 

Egyptian wooden-pin locks, Chinese padlocks, American time locks, etc., are all displayed in lighted glass cases on the second floor of the General Society. Alongside the cases are studded trunks, with cleverly concealed keyholes, once used by bankers. Many of the examples are unique, made-to-order locks that were not produced in commercial quantities and nearly every lock has protected millions in money and securities.

To augment the lock collection. Mr. Mossman donated his notes and scrapbooks, known as the "Mossman Papers", which have proven to be a valuable resource for the study of locks. The Lure of the Lock was published in 1928 and describes each lock in the collection. This publication, as well as a photo CD of the collection, are available from the Society.

Collections of various antebellum curios, rare books, prints, flags, clocks and medals have also been donated by friends and members.  Admission is $10 for viewing this museum collection, which is open to the public.

References 
 
 Hopkins, Albert Allis, (1869–1939). The Lure of the Lock; a short treatise on locks to elucidate the John M. Mossman collection of locks in the museum of the General Society of Mechanics and Tradesmen in the city of New York, including some of the "Mossman Papers". With 500 illustrations. New York, General Society of Mechanics and Tradesmen (1928).

External links

 Mossman Lock Collection - The General Society of Mechanics & Tradesmen of the City of New York

Locksmithing museums
Security
Banking in the United States
Technology museums in New York (state)
Museums in Manhattan
Midtown Manhattan
Museums of economics